Jerzy Borejsza (born Beniamin Goldberg; 14 July 1905 in Warsaw – 19 January 1952 in Warsaw) was a Polish communist activist and writer. During the Stalinist period of communist Poland, he was chief of a state press and publishing syndicate.

Biography

Borejsza was born as Beniamin Goldberg to a Polish Jewish family. He was an older brother of Józef Różański – later a member of the Soviet NKVD and high-ranking interrogator in the Ministry of Public Security of Poland. As a youth, Borejsza sympathized with the Zionist radical left and anarchic political factions. After he got in trouble with the Polish authorities, his father sponsored his residence in France. Borejsza studied engineering, then Hispanic culture at the Sorbonne, and remained deeply involved with the politics and activism of anarchism.

After his studies, Borejsza returned home and was briefly enlisted in the Polish Army in the late 1920s. In 1929, he joined the Communist Party of Poland (KPP). In the Second Polish Republic, he was imprisoned several times in the years 1933–1935 for agitation and political propaganda.

After the Soviet invasion of Poland of 1939, Borejsza became a vocal supporter of the Soviet communist regime, publishing Polish language translations of Soviet propaganda. He served as director of the Ossolineum Institute in Lwów (Lviv) in 1939–1940. After the war, as Lviv was transferred to the Ukrainian SSR, he aided the transport of most of Ossolineum archives to Wrocław. He was one of the founders of the Union of Polish Patriots – an organization from which the communist government of post-war Poland in part originated. Borejsza served with the rank of major in the Red Army, and then in the Polish First Army.

He joined the new pro-Soviet Polish communist party, the Polish Workers' Party, and became a deputy to the State National Council. He organized much of communist propaganda in post-war Poland and was a leading figure in the implementation of state control and censorship in the area of culture. He created the giant publishing house Czytelnik ('The Reader'). Borejsza favored a moderate approach to culture control, which he called a "gentle revolution". He supported establishing cultural relations with the West, and himself traveled to United States and the United Kingdom. In 1948, he was one of the main organizers of the World Congress of Intellectuals in Defense of Peace in Wrocław. He fell out of favor with the Stalinist hardliners who saw him as too independent, too hard to influence, and not radical enough. His political role diminished in the late 1940s, particularly after the disabling injuries he suffered in a car accident in 1949.

Borejsza received the Order of Polonia Restituta. He was buried at the Powązki Cemetery in Warsaw.

Works
 Hiszpania 1873–1936 ('Spain 1873–1936', 1937)
 Na rogatkach kultury polskiej ('At the Outskirts of Polish Culture', 1947)

Quotes
Czesław Miłosz, Polish writer and Nobel Prize winner, once wrote in his memoirs about Borejsza: "The most international of Polish communists. ... He built from nothing, starting in 1945, his paper empire of books and press. Czytelnik and other publishing houses, newspapers, magazines; all was dependent on him – jobs, publications, wages. I was in his stable, we all were."
Maria Dąbrowska, Polish writer, wrote about him in her memoirs: "He created a large organization, an organization encompassing the publishing – newspapers-books and readers, created with an almost American flare. But the aim of this organization was a slow and deliberate Sovietization and Russification of Polish culture."
Jan Kott, Polish writer, wrote about him in his memoirs: "...simply known as the Boss. ... Czytelnik was a state within a state … especially for writers. "
Pablo Neruda, Chilean poet and Nobel Prize winner, also wrote in his memoirs about Borejsza: "Borejsza was a tireless down to earth man, who converted dreams into actions. ...  Now the great Borejsza, a scrawny, dynamic Quixote, an admirer of Sancho Panza like the other Quixote, sensitive and wise, builder and dreamer, is resting for the first time" – Pablo Neruda, "Pablo Neruda Memoirs" (Original Spanish Edition: Confieso que he vivido: memorias, 1974), Farrar Straus and Giroux, 1977.

See also
Culture in the Polish People's Republic

Notes

Further reading
 E. Krasucki, Międzynarodowy komunista. Jerzy Borejsza – biografia polityczna, Warszawa 2009. 
 J. Centkowski, Jerzy Borejsza (1905–1952), in: Materiały Pomocnicze do Historii Dziennikarstwa Polski Ludowej, J. Centkowski and A. Słomkowska (red.), z. 4, Warszawa 1974.
 B. Fijałkowska, Borejsza i Różański. Przyczynek do dziejów stalinizmu w Polsce, Olsztyn 1995., 
 Z. Gregorczyk, Działalność Jerzego Borejszy w okresie lubelskim, in: Prasa lubelska: tradycje i współczesność, J. Jarowiecki et al. (red.), Lublin 1986.
 K. Koźniewski, Rogatywki Jerzego Borejszy, in: Zostanie mit, Warszawa 1988
 E. Krasucki, Ujmując w dłoń skalpel materializmu. Wizja kultury socjalistycznej w publicystyce Jerzego Borejszy z "Lewara" i "Sygnałów" (1934–1939), in: Społeczeństwo – polityka – kultura. Studia nad dziejami prasy w II Rzeczypospolitej, T. Sikorski (red.), Szczecin 2006.

1905 births
1952 deaths
Writers from Warsaw
People from Warsaw Governorate
Jews from the Russian Empire
Jewish Polish politicians
Communist Party of Poland politicians
Polish Workers' Party politicians
Polish United Workers' Party members
Members of the State National Council
Jewish socialists
Polish People's Army personnel
Polish military personnel of World War II
Polish male writers
Polish prisoners and detainees
Prisoners and detainees of Poland
Recipients of the Order of Polonia Restituta (1944–1989)
Burials at Powązki Cemetery